The Parliament of Cantabria, is the unicameral legislature of the Autonomous Community of Cantabria. It consists of 35 members called "deputies" which are freely elected by the citizens of the region. The Parliament convenes at the Saint Raphael Hospital, an 18th century building in the City of Santander rehabilitated in the 1980s to house the Regional Assembly.

Prior to 1998, the Parliament was called Regional Assembly of Cantabria.

The Regionalist Party of Cantabria is the largest party in parliament, with 14 of the 35 deputies, followed by the People's Party with 9 and the Socialist Party with 7. Other minor parties are Citizens with 3 deputies and Vox with 2. The Regionalist Party governs currently the region in coalition with the Socialist Party.

Elections and voting 
The number of seats in the Parliament of Cantabria is set to a fixed-number of 35. All Parliament members are elected to a four-year term in a single multi-member district, consisting of the Community's territory (the province of Cantabria), using the D'Hondt method and a closed-list proportional representation system.

Voting is on the basis of universal suffrage in a secret ballot. Only lists polling above 5% of valid votes in all of the community (which include blank ballots—for none of the above) are entitled to enter the seat distribution.

The first elections were held in 1983 when the People's Coalition won a majority of seats and José Antonio Rodríguez became the first regional president. In the most recent elections, held on 26 May 2019 the Regionalist Party of Cantabria won 40% of the seats, needing the Socialist Party to govern. The next elections are expected to be held in 2023.

Building

The building where the Parliament of Cantabria is placed is the old Hospital of Saint Raphael, in the High Street (old district) of Santander, Spain.

The hospital was built in 1791 as a charity hospital for poors and main hospital of Santander. It served during the Independence War and the disaster of the Cabo Machichaco. The hospital closed down in 1928, and in 1982, the regional assembly of Cantabria started the restoration project of the building, which ended in 1984 and won some awards.

Parliamentary bodies

Bureau 
The Bureau of the Parliament of Cantabria is formed by the Speaker of the Parliament, two Deputy Speakers and two Secretaries.

Board of Spokespersons 
The Board of Spokespersons is a parliamentary body consisting of the spokespersons of the parliamentary groups. Its main task is to decide the agenda.

Committees 
The Committees are formed by a group of deputies appointed by their respective Parliamentary Groups. Within them, legislative initiatives are known and discussed before they are debated in Parliament's Plenary.

There are different types of Committees. They are called Standing Committees to those that are expressly established in the Standing Rules of the Parliament. The Non-Standing Committees are created to discuss a specific issue or matter during a legislature.

Each Committee elects a Bureau consisting of a Chair, a Deputy Chair and a Secretary.

, there are 12 standing committees. There are no non-standing committees.

Transparency

The Parliament of Cantabria is one of the most transparent regional parliaments in Spain (98,8%).

All the students of Cantabria go to the Parliament at least once on a school trip, where they meet some deputies and usually the President of the Parliament. They are told about the history of the building, how the Parliament works and how they can participate in democracy. Sessions are retransmitted by the regional television broadcaster Tele Bahía.

See also
 List of presidents of the Parliament of Cantabria

References

 
1982 establishments in Cantabria
Cantabria